Surendranath Law College (Bengali :সুরেন্দ্রনাথ আইন কলেজ) formerly known as Ripon College) is an postgraduate law college affiliated with the University of Calcutta. It was established in Kolkata in the Indian state of West Bengal in 1885 by a trust formed by the nationalist leader, scholar and educationist Surendranath Banerjee, a year after he founded Surendranath College. This is now regarded one of the oldest Law college of British India.

History
The first name of the college was Presidency School in 1882, when it was handed over to Sri Banerjee on 1 January 1884. That same year the Post-Graduate Department of Law was extended, and it was affiliated to the Calcutta University as an independent professional college in 1885. Banerjee renamed the school the Presidency Institution and brought it to the status of a college affiliated to the F.A. standard. The name was later changed to Ripon College, named after the British Viceroy George Robinson, 1st Marquess of Ripon. The name was changed again in 1949 to honour its founder Sri Surendranath Banerjee. The women's section of the college was founded in 1931 by Mira Datta Gupta, its first principal. Swami Vivekananda delivered his first address in Calcutta from the rostrum of this college on his return from Chicago after his famous deliverance at the Parliament of the World's Religions in Chicago in 1893. In 1911, Rabindranath Tagore read out at this college one of his essays dealing with the twin subjects of separatism to be found among many of countrymen and national integration. This college was recognised by the University Grants Commission in 1972. The college now offers LLM courses.

Notable alumni 
 Dr. Rajendra Prasad - The first President of India.
 Harendra Coomar Mookerjee - The first Governor of West Bengal.
 Sir Bijan Kumar Mukherjea - The first Bengali Chief Justice of the Supreme Court of India.
 Birendranath Sasmal - Nationalist barrister and politician.
 Manmatha Nath Mukherjee - Judge, Calcutta High Court and Bengali jurist
 Mohammad Mohammadullah - President of Bangladesh
 Panchanan Barma - Social reformer
 Dhirendranath Datta - Indian Freedom fighter and Bangladeshi activist.
 Khondakar Abu Taleb - Bangladeshi journalist and Martyr
 Shahidullah Kaiser - Bengali intellectual and Martyr
 Phani Bhushan Majumder - Former minister of Bangladesh
 Rabin Deb - Bengali politician
 Golam Rahman (writer) - Bengali writer
 Aniruddha Bose - Judge of the Supreme Court of India
 Abdul Matin Chaudhury (1895-1948) - Muslim league politician

See also 
Surendranath College
Surendranath Evening College
Surendranath College for Women
List of colleges affiliated to the University of Calcutta
Education in West Bengal

References

External links

Surendranath Law College

University of Calcutta affiliates
Educational institutions established in 1885
Law schools in West Bengal
1885 establishments in India
Academic institutions associated with the Bengal Renaissance